Phillip Meredith Ligrani is an American mechanical engineer. As of 2022, he is eminent scholar in propulsion and professor of mechanical and aerospace engineering at the University of Alabama in Huntsville.

Career

Ligrani was born in Cheyenne, Wyoming. After receiving his Bachelor of Science degree in mechanical engineering from the University of Texas at Austin in 1974, he pursued his graduate studies at Stanford University where he received  his master's degree in 1975 and his PhD in 1980. His doctoral dissertation was entitled The thermal and hydrodynamic behaviour of thick, roughwall, turbulent boundary layers. After completing his PhD he spent several years in Europe, first in a temporary faculty position at the Von Karman Institute for Fluid Dynamics in Belgium and then as a visiting senior research fellow at the Imperial College of Science and Technology in London. He returned to the United States in 1984, where he was an associate professor in the Department of Mechanical Engineering at the U.S. Naval Postgraduate School, a position he held until 1992. He joined the faculty of the Department of Mechanical Engineering at University of Utah in 1992 and became a full professor there in 1997.

From 2006 through 2009 Ligrani was the Donald Schultz Professor of Turbomachinery in the Department of Engineering Science at the University of Oxford. During that time he also served as the director of Oxford's Rolls-Royce UTC (University Technology Centre) in Heat Transfer and Aerodynamics and as professorial fellow at St Catherine's College, Oxford. He returned to the US in 2010, when he was appointed to the Oliver L. Parks Endowed Chair at Saint Louis University's Parks College of Engineering, Aviation and Technology.

In September 2014 Ligrani was appointed eminent scholar in propulsion and professor of mechanical and aerospace engineering at the University of Alabama in Huntsville.

Research
Ligrani's research has focused on turbomachinery, convective heat transfer, fluid mechanics, microfluidics, fractionation and separation science. As of 2017, he has authored or co-authored more than 173 publications in scientific journals and nine book chapters and holds three active patents.

References

External links
Google Scholar profile
 
 Steele, Jim  (14 October 2015). "UAH building $2 million wind tunnel". University of Alabama in Huntsville 
 University of Alabama in Huntsville. Mechanical & Aerospace Department: Research

Year of birth missing (living people)
Living people
Saint Louis University faculty
University of Alabama in Huntsville faculty